Escape Artists Productions, LLC, commonly known as Escape Artists, is an independently financed motion picture and television production company with a first look non-exclusive deal at Sony Pictures Entertainment, headed by partners Steve Tisch, Todd Black, and Jason Blumenthal.

The company's production office is located in the Astaire Building on the Sony Pictures Studios lot in Culver City, California.

History
In 2001, Todd Black and Jason Blumenthal's Black & Blu merged with the Steve Tisch Company to form Escape Artists.

The first produced movie under the Escape Artists banner was A Knight's Tale, starring Heath Ledger in May 2001.  In the fall of 2005, Escape Artists released The Weather Man, directed by Gore Verbinski and starring Nicolas Cage and Michael Caine.  Their next film, The Pursuit of Happyness, directed by Gabriele Muccino and starring Will Smith, was released in December 2006 and earned over $300 million in worldwide ticket sales, as well as best actor Academy Award and Golden Globe nominations for Will Smith.  Seven Pounds, another Gabriele Muccino-directed film starring Will Smith, was released in December 2008. In 2009, Escape Artists released the Alex Proyas thriller Knowing, starring Nicolas Cage, and The Taking of Pelham 123, directed by Tony Scott and starring Denzel Washington and John Travolta. Their latest project entitled, The Upside directed by Neil Burger and starring Kevin Hart was released through STX Entertainment and Lantern Entertainment on January 11, 2019 in the United States.

In February 2013, 12-year veteran David Bloomfield was promoted to partner Escape Artists. In October 2014, the company inks its first-look pact with FX Productions. In August 2019, MGM Television inks its first-look deal with Escape Artists.

List of films

Columbia Pictures
A Knight's Tale (2001)
The Pursuit of Happyness (also with Overbrook Entertainment) (2006)
Seven Pounds (also with Overbrook Entertainment) (2008)
The Taking of Pelham 123 (also with Metro-Goldwyn-Mayer and Scott Free Productions) (2009)
Hope Springs (also with Metro-Goldwyn-Mayer and Mandate Pictures) (2012)
Sex Tape (2014)
The Equalizer (also with Village Roadshow Pictures) (2014)
The Magnificent Seven (also with Metro-Goldwyn-Mayer and Village Roadshow Pictures) (2016)
Roman J. Israel, Esq. (2017)
The Equalizer 2 (2018)
A Journal for Jordan (2021)
The Man from Toronto (also with Netflix) (2022)
The Equalizer 3 (2023)

Others
Alex & Emma (with Warner Bros. Pictures and Franchise Pictures) (2003)
The Weather Man (with Paramount Pictures) (2005)
Knowing (with Summit Entertainment) (2009)
The Back-up Plan (with CBS Films) (2010)
Unfinished Business (with 20th Century Fox and Regency Enterprises) (2015)
Southpaw (with The Weinstein Company) (2015)
Fences (with Paramount Pictures) (2016)
The Upside (with STX Entertainment and Lantern Entertainment) (2017)
Troop Zero (with Amazon Studios) (2020)
Ma Rainey's Black Bottom (with Netflix) (2020)
Being the Ricardos (with Amazon Studios) (2021)
Emancipation (with Apple TV+) (2022)
Masters of the Universe (with Netflix and Mattel Films) (TBA)

List of television shows
Perpetual Grace, LTD  (Epix) (with MGM Television, Chi-Town Pictures and Elephant Pictures) (2019)
Servant (Apple TV+) (with Blinding Edge Pictures and Dolphin Black Productions) (2019–present)
Dr. Death (Peacock) (with Universal Content Productions, Wondery and Littleton Road Productions) (2021)

References

External links
 Official site

Film production companies of the United States
Entertainment companies based in California
Companies based in Culver City, California
American companies established in 2001
Entertainment companies established in 2001
2001 establishments in California
American independent film studios